Sandy Hoffmann (born 16 April 1993) is a German former competitive figure skater. She has one senior international medal, bronze at the 2012 Warsaw Cup, and is the 2013 German national bronze medalist.

Career 
Hoffmann was coached by Evelyn Gutzeit until early summer 2008, when Gutzeit retired from coaching. Since then, she is coached by Ilona Schindler and Ingrid Lehmann, former coaches of Simone Koch, in Dresden and Chemnitz, Germany.

Hoffmann won junior titles at the Bavarian Open and the Heiko Fischer Pokal. She made her Junior Grand Prix debut at the 2008–2009 ISU Junior Grand Prix event in Ostrava, Czech Republic, where she placed 5th and set her personal best. During this competition, she was coached by Ilona Schindler.

Hoffmann made her international senior debut at the 2008 NRW Trophy in Dortmund and her national senior debut at the 2009 German Championships in Oberstdorf.

Programs

Competitive highlights
CS: Challenger Series; JGP: Junior Grand Prix

References

 2008 Czech Skate Ladies Results
 2008 Bavarian Open Junior Ladies Results
 2008 Heiko Fischer Pokal Junior Ladies Results
 2010 Heiko Fischer Pokal Senior Ladies Results
 2011 Bavarian Open Senior Ladies Results

External links
 
 Sandy Hoffmann at The Figure Skating Corner
 Sandy Hoffmann at sport-folio.net
 Sandy Hoffmann at Tracings.net

1993 births
Living people
People from Freital
German female single skaters
Sportspeople from Saxony
20th-century German women
21st-century German women